Peter Gustav Olausson (born 6 November 1971) is a Swedish author and webmaster. Since 2003 he has collected and published factoids, on the Internet as well as in several books.

Biography
Olausson was born and raised on Tjörn, Sweden. He is educated in computational linguistics and works as a webmaster.

Since 2003 Olausson has been collecting factoids, a term that has been compared to "urban legend". He has described and published these on the Internet and in several books. The first book was published in 2008, and book number three in the series has been translated to Norwegian.

In 2009 he participated in the radio series Mytjägarna, in which Olausson and the program leader Tobias Svanelid searched for popular misconceptions, factoids and myths. The eight programs in the program series have since been repeated several times, the last time during the summer of 2012.

Peter Olausson has been a board member of the Swedish Skeptics Association on various occasions and from 2017 to 2018 he was chairman of the association. From 2012 he was a board member of the association's Gothenburg chapter and from 2015 its chairman.  In March 2017 he left his role as chairman, which was taken over by Karin Noomi Karlsson.

Books

Awards 

 2019 – Det gyllene förstoringsglaset (from the Metro Newspaper "Viralgranskaren" + The Internet Foundation in Sweden)

References

External links 
 Webbplatsen faktoider.nu
 faktoider.blogspot.com

1971 births
Swedish male writers
Living people
Swedish skeptics
People from Tjörn Municipality